"Ceux que l'amour a blessés" is a song by French singer Johnny Hallyday. It was released as a single in January 1970.

Composition and writing 
The song was written by Jean Renard and Gilles Thibaut. The recording was produced by Lee Hallyday.

Commercial performance 
In France the single spent three weeks at no. 1 on the singles sales chart (in February–March 1970).

Track listing 
7" single Philips 336.292 BF (1970, France etc.)
 A. "Ceux que l'amour a blessés" (3:37)
 B. "Si tu pars" (4:05)

Charts

References

External links 
 Johnny Hallyday – "Ceux que l'amour a blessés" (single) at Discogs

1970 songs
1970 singles
French songs
Johnny Hallyday songs
Philips Records singles
SNEP Top Singles number-one singles
Songs written by Jean Renard (songwriter)
Songs written by Gilles Thibaut
Song recordings produced by Lee Hallyday